Jan Hofmeyer is a suburb of Johannesburg, South Africa, located in Region F of the City of Johannesburg Metropolitan Municipality. The suburb was named after Jan Hendrik Hofmeyr (20 March 1894 – 3 December 1948), a South African politician and intellectual in the years preceding Apartheid.

History 
The suburb’s origins date back to 1935, where it was created for cheap housing.

References

Johannesburg Region F